José Martínez Azcuis (July 26, 1942 – October 1, 2014) was a Cuban-born Major League Baseball infielder, coach, executive and scout.

Born in Cárdenas in Matanzas Province, he attended La Progresiva High School in his native city and signed with the Pirates in 1961. In 1969, he made his MLB debut; his 77 games played included 34 starts at second base, third on the club behind Baseball Hall of Famer Bill Mazeroski and Gene Alley, the Pirates' former starting shortstop. On September 8, Martínez hit his only major league home run, a ninth-inning grand slam off Claude Raymond of the Montreal Expos that delivered the winning runs in a 6–2 Pittsburgh victory at Jarry Park Stadium.

Late in May 1970, Martínez returned to the minor leagues, where he spent the remainder of his playing career. He was acquired by the Kansas City Royals' organization in 1972, beginning a 16-year-long association with the club. He managed in the Royals' farm system from 1976–1979 and then joined the team's MLB coaching staff. Working under skippers Jim Frey, Dick Howser, Mike Ferraro, Billy Gardner and John Wathan for eight seasons (1980–1987), he served on the team's 1980 American League pennant winners and the 1985 world championship team. He spent seven years as a member of the Cubs' coaching staff, working for four different managers.

In 1995, John Schuerholz, who had been farm system director and then general manager of the Royals during Martínez' tenure in Kansas City, brought Martínez to the Atlanta Braves' front office as his special assistant, and Martínez worked for the Braves for 20 years until his death on October 1, 2014.

References

External links

Venezuelan Professional Baseball League statistics

1942 births
2014 deaths
Asheville Tourists players
Atlanta Braves executives
Atlanta Braves scouts
Batavia Pirates players
Cardenales de Lara players
Caribbean Series managers
Charleston Charlies players
Chicago Cubs coaches
Columbus Jets players
Dubuque Packers players
Grand Forks Chiefs players
Kansas City Royals coaches
Kinston Eagles players
Leones del Caracas players
Cuban expatriate baseball players in Venezuela
Llaneros de Acarigua players
Major League Baseball first base coaches
Major League Baseball players from Cuba
Cuban expatriate baseball players in the United States
Major League Baseball second basemen
Minor league baseball managers
Omaha Royals players
People from Cárdenas, Cuba
Pittsburgh Pirates players
Tiburones de La Guaira players
York Pirates players